Moretum is a herb cheese spread that the Ancient Romans ate with bread. A typical moretum was made of herbs, fresh cheese, salt, oil and some vinegar. Optionally, different kinds of nuts could be added. The contents were crushed together in a mortar, hence the name.

Recipes
A recipe can be found in the poem of the same name in the Appendix Vergiliana. De re rustica, book XII of Columella contains further recipes for moretum. The variant with pine nuts is considered to be a precursor of pesto.

See also

 Ancient Roman cuisine
 List of cheese dishes
 List of spreads

References

External links
 
 Appendix Vergiliana in Latin
 Columella at The Latin Library
 Columella Books I–IV in English translation at LacusCurtius

Roman cuisine
Spreads (food)
Cheese dishes
Ancient dishes